All Tomorrow's Parties is a 2003 Chinese science fiction film directed by Yu Lik-wai. It was screened in the Un Certain Regard section at the 2003 Cannes Film Festival.

Cast
 Cho Yong-won as Xuelan
 Diao Yinan as Xiao Zhuai
 Na Ren as Lanlan
 Zhao Weiwei as Xiao Mian

References

External links

2003 films
2003 science fiction films
Films directed by Yu Lik-wai
Chinese science fiction films
Chinese-language films